The Diary of Diana B. is a 2019 biographical film directed by Dana Budisavljević. The film tells the story of the aid operation of humanitarian Diana Budisavljević for the rescue of more than 10,000 - mainly Orthodox Christian Serbs - children from concentration camps in the Independent State of Croatia during WWII. The film had its world premiere at the 2019 Pula Film Festival. It won four Golden Arenas, including the Big Golden Arena for Best Film.

Cast
 Alma Prica - Diana Budisavljević
  - Ivanka Džakula
  - Julije Budisavljević
 Ermin Bravo – Kamilo Bresler
 Areta Ćurković – Dragica Habazin
 Mirjana Karanović – Mira Kušević
 Vilim Matula - narednik Hecker
 Krešimir Mikić - Robert Stein
 Krunoslav Šarić - Đuro Vukosavljević
 Tihomir Stanić - Marko Vidaković
 Livio Badurina - Alojzije Stepinac
 Boris Ostan - Gustav von Koczian
 Barbara Prpić - Lydia Alexandra von Koczian
 Urša Raukar - tailor

Production 

In June 2017, the European co-production fund Eurimages granted 160,000 EUR in support for the Croatian-Slovenian-Serbian co-production The DB Campaign (working title Diana's List) by Dana Budisavljević.

The feature film was retitled The Diary of Diana B. and its world premiere was at the Pula Film Festival on 18 July 2019.

Reception 

The film was awarded with the Grand Golden Arena for Best Festival Film, Golden Arena for best Director, Golden Arena for Editing, Golden Arena for Best Music, Golden Gate of Pula Audience Award and recognition for Best Croatian Feature Film

References

External links 
 

Croatian biographical films
Croatian black-and-white films
World War II films based on actual events
Holocaust films
Films about Nazism
Films set in 1942
Films set in 1943
Films set in 1944
Films set in 1945
2010s war films
Films set in Yugoslavia
War films set in Partisan Yugoslavia
Cultural depictions of Austrian women